Acciaroli is an Italian hamlet (frazione), the most populous in the comune of Pollica, Province of Salerno, in the Campania Region.

Geography
Acciaroli is a port on the Cilento coast on the Tyrrhenian Sea.  The largest township in its comune, followed by the hamlet of Pioppi, it is six kilometers from Pollica, 20 from Santa Maria di Castellabate, 17 from Velia, 30 from Agropoli, and 70 from Salerno.

Tourism
The town is a part of "Cilento and Vallo di Diano National Park", whose natural environment is made up of the "maquis shrubland" typical of the Mediterranean region.

It is a major tourist destination, especially during summer, because it has grown famous nationally for its water quality, having earned the "Blue Flag beach" title and the "Five Sails" of Legambiente, an Italian environmentalist association, for several years.

Culture
After World War II, Ernest Hemingway chose Acciaroli as a place to stay during trips to Italy.

Cuisine 
In and around the area of Acciaroli, a very pungent variety of rosemary is cultivated, and is consumed regularly in the local cuisine. It is claimed to smell ten times stronger than the average rosemary. Due to the vast health benefits from consuming rosemary, as well as the other various ingredients regularly consumed in the local diet, it is claimed that this has aided the unusually high number of centenarians in the area live as long as they have.

Centenarians 
In 2016, scientists studied the town because of its unusually high number of centenarians, some 300, with 20 percent of those reaching the age of 110. This longevity occurs despite the fact that many of the elderly in Acciaroli smoke or are overweight.

The centenarians of Acciaroli are also known to have very low rates of heart disease and of Alzheimer’s disease.

Gallery

See also
Pioppi
Cilento
Cilento and Vallo di Diano National Park

References

External links

 Acciaroli.info website
 Comune of Pollica
 Acciaroli on Italian Guide

Frazioni of the Province of Salerno
Localities of Cilento